The Vario Crew,  also known as the Canarsie Crew, is a group of Italian-American mobsters within the Lucchese crime family that controls organized crime activities within the New York metropolitan area but has been predominantly based from Brooklyn neighborhoods of Canarsie and Flatlands. In the past the crew was controlled by capo Paul Vario from the early 1950s into the early 1980s, when Vario, Jimmy Burke, and a number of other associates were imprisoned, primarily due to the testimony of another long-term associate, Henry Hill. Hill's life in the Vario crew was the subject of Nicholas Pileggi's book Wiseguy and Martin Scorsese's crime film adapted from that book, Goodfellas (1990), starring Ray Liotta as Hill.

The crew has since been merged with the 19th Hole crew (Vic Amuso and Christopher “Christie Tick” Furnari's old crew) out of Bensonhurst to form the current Brooklyn faction of the Lucchese Borgata.

History

Paul Vario's power
Paul Vario received money from members of his crew and local criminals. Vario's crew was involved in hijacking cargo shipments from JFK Airport in Queens, NY; they also ran several loansharking and bookmaking operations in Brooklyn.

James Burke, a close ally of Vario's, ran a crew of hijackers that would pay off truck drivers and then unload the goods at a warehouse Vario controlled. Another ally of Vario's was John Dioguardi, a Lucchese family  capo who controlled labor unions in New York City. In the 1970s, when Vario and Burke were imprisoned, the majority of Vario's bookmaking operations were taken over by his Russian Jewish associate, Martin Krugman.

Henry Hill's drug organization
Two of Vario's crew members, Henry Hill and Jimmy Burke, began dealing in amphetamines, cocaine, heroin, and marijuana. Hill ran his criminal enterprise with his wife Karen, William Arico, Anthony and Rocco Perla, Robin Cooperman, and Judith Wicks. In early 1979, Burke and Hill began selling heroin.

After Robert "Bobby" Germaine Jr., the son of Henry Hill's drug partner, became an informant, Hill was monitored. In 1980, Hill was arrested for drug dealing and looking at several life-sentences. He accepted the option to become an informant.

Hill's testimony led to 50 convictions. In 1980, on Burke's orders, Angelo Sepe shot and killed  Bobby Germaine, Jr. in Kew Gardens, Queens.

Burke was given 20 years for fixing sporting events and a life sentence when the authorities convicted him for murdering scam-artist Richard Eaton. Vario was given a 12½-year sentence during the KENRAC trial.

Robert's Lounge Crew
The Robert's Lounge Crew was a semi-independent group of criminals working under the Vario Crew, led by Jimmy Burke, and based in Burke's bar, Robert's Lounge. They were active from 1957 to 1979.

The Robert's Lounge crew comprised numerous members, some described as inept, whose specialties included armed robbery, hijacking, and murder. Although an independent outfit, they were closely associated with the Lucchese Family through which Burke had a longtime friendship and working relationship with Vario.

Historical leadership

Caporegimes
1930s–1950s – Salvatore "Don Turiddo" Curiale 
1950s–1988 – Paul Vario — in 1984 he was sentenced to  years in prison; he died on May 3, 1988
Acting 1970–1988 – Vito "Tuddy" Vario — Vario's younger brother
1988–1991 – Alphonse "Little Al" D'Arco — served as Street Boss from May 1990 to January 1991; then served as Acting Boss from January 1991 to July 1991 when he was demoted; he became a government witness on September 21, 1991
Acting 1990–1991 – Louis Daidone — promoted to official capo. 
1991–1992 – Louis "Louie Bagels" Daidone — imprisoned on May 1, 1992.
1992–2017 – Domenico "Danny" Cutaia — released from prison on October 5, 2013 died August 14, 2018
Acting 2008 – Michael "Mikey Bones" Corcione — arrested in 2008
Acting 2010 – Carlo Profeta — arrested in 2010
2017–2020 – Patrick “Patty Red” Dellorusso — promoted to underboss

Current members and associates
Members
Salvatore Cutaia (Soldier)
John Baudanza (Soldier)
Michael "Mikey Bones" Corcione (Soldier)
Carlo Profeta (Soldier)
Peter Vario (son of Paul Vario, former capo of crew)

Associates
Joseph Cutaia (Associate)
Steven Lapella (Associate)
Victor Sperber (Associate)
Louis Colello (Associate)
John Rodopolous (Associate)

Past members and associates
These are past members and associates who have retired, been murdered, or died other ways.
Soldiers 
Frank Manzo (Soldier)
Vito "Tuddy" Vario (Soldier)
Peter "Rugsy" Vario (Soldier)
Peter "Jocko" Vario (Soldier)
Salvatore "Babe" Vario (Soldier)
Thomas Vario (Soldier)
Peter "Pete the Killer" Abinati (Soldier)
Leonard Vario Jr. (Soldier)
Joseph D'Arco (Soldier)
Bruno Facciolo (Soldier)
Rosario Sacco (Soldier)
Luigi Sacco (Soldier)
Alfonso "Foo" Curiale (Soldier)
Paolo Danna (Soldier)
Ray Argentina (Soldier)
Joseph Chiavo (Soldier)
Carmine "Fats" Taglialatela (Soldier)
Louis "Lou Bagels" Daidone (Acting Capo)
Associates
Clyde Brooks (associate, died in 1994)
Angelo 'Sonny Bamboo' McConnach (associate, died in 1996)
Joseph Abinati (associate)
Thomas "Tommy Red" Gilmore (associate, Murdered on February 6, 1989)
Frank James Burke (associate, murdered on May 18, 1987)
Jimmy Burke (associate, died on April 13, 1996)
Louis Cafora (associate disappeared in March 1979)
Thomas DeSimone (associate, murdered on January 14, 1979)
Richard Eaton (associate, murdered on July 18, 1979)
Henry Hill (associate, became a witness in 1980, died on June 12, 2012)
Martin Krugman (associate, disappeared on January 6, 1979)
Angelo Sepe (associate, murdered on July 18, 1984)
Louis Werner (associate, convicted on May 16, 1979)

Former headquarters and hangouts
The crew operates throughout the New York City; these are some of its former headquarters and hangouts.

 La Donna Rosa Restaurant in Little Italy, Manhattan
 Bargain Auto Junkyard
Euclid Taxi Cab Company in Brownsville, Brooklyn
Geffkens Bar – a bar owned by Paul Vario
 Kew Motor Inn
Robert's Lounge – the former headquarters of Jimmy Burke's crew, located on Lefferts Boulevard and Rockaway Boulevard in South Ozone Park, Queens
The Bamboo Lounge – former hangout, located on Rockaway Parkway and Avenue N in Canarsie, Brooklyn
The Lefferts Bar –
The Suite – a former hangout owned by Henry Hill, located on Queens Boulevard near Forest Hills, Queens

Government informants and witnesses
 Richard Bilello – associate, murdered on October 28, 1974
Alphonse "Little Al" D'Arco – became a witness on September 21, 1991, died in 2019
Theresa Ferrara – became a government informant, disappeared on February 10, 1979
 Peter Gruenwald – associate, became a witness in 1978, died in 1979
Henry Hill – associate, became a witness in 1980, died on June 12, 2012

In popular culture
Goodfellas (1990), directed by Martin Scorsese, is based on the Vario Crew and the life story of crew associate Henry Hill (portrayed by Ray Liotta)

References
Notes

Sources
Nicholas Pileggi, Wiseguy: Life In A Mafia Family (1986)
Greg and Gina Hill. On the Run: A Mafia Childhood
May, Allan. The Lufthansa Heist Revisited. TruTv.com

 

 
Organizations established in the 1950s
1950s establishments in New York (state)
Lucchese crime family
American Mafia crews
Gangs in New York City
Canarsie, Brooklyn